The Jamia Mosque is a mosque in Mid-Levels, Hong Kong. The mosque is the oldest mosque in Hong Kong. The neighbouring streets Mosque Street and Mosque Junction are named after this mosque. Mufti Abdul Zaman is the main Imam of this Mosque and he leads prayers and taraweeh in the month of Ramadan.

History
The mosque was built in 1890 on a piece of land leased by the British Hong Kong government for 999 years. The treaty for the land was granted on 23 December 1850. Initially, the mosque was named Mohammedan Mosque. Extension of the building took place in 1915 which made the mosque into a larger building. After World War II, the mosque was renamed Jamia Mosque. It is also known as Lascar Temple.

Architecture
The mosque has a rectangular shape with an arched main entrance and Arabic-style arched windows on all sides.

A three-storey residential building next to the mosque provides rent-free accommodation to followers. It was probably built in the early 20th century.

Conservation
The mosque has been classified as a Grade I building by the Government of Hong Kong in May 2010 which are described as "outstanding merits of which every effort should be made to preserve if possible." The nearby three-storey residential building has been classified as a Grade II building.

Future expansions
There has been a plan to construct an Islamic Cultural Center by its side in the future.

Transportation
The mosque is accessible within walking distance South West from Central station of the MTR.

See also
 Islam in Hong Kong
 Central and Western Heritage Trail
 Incorporated Trustees of the Islamic Community Fund of Hong Kong
 List of mosques in Hong Kong

References

External links

 Antiquities Advisory Board. Pictures of Jamia Mosque
 Antiquities Advisory Board. Pictures of the Residence of Muslims

1890 establishments in Hong Kong
Indian diaspora in China
Mosques in Hong Kong
Mid-Levels
Declared monuments of Hong Kong
Grade II historic buildings in Hong Kong
Pakistani diaspora in Asia
Punjabi diaspora in Asia
Mosques completed in 1905